

Medal winners in Spain women's national basketball team 
Full list of the 55 medal winners while playing in Spain women's national basketball team since 1993 (first medal): Olympic Games, World Cups and EuroBaskets. 

Note: updated to 2019 FIBA Women's EuroBasket

See also 
 Spain women's national basketball team
 Spanish Basketball Federation
 Basketball at the Summer Olympics
 FIBA Women's Basketball World Cup
 EuroBasket Women

References

External links 
 FIBA Europe official website
 Official website
 Spanish Basketball Federation website 

Spain women's national basketball team
Basketball statistics